Argininosuccinate synthetase is an enzyme that in humans is encoded by the ASS1 gene.

The protein encoded by this gene catalyzes the penultimate step of the arginine biosynthetic pathway. There are approximately 10 to 14 copies of this gene including the pseudogenes scattered across the human genome, among which the one located on chromosome 9 appears to be the only functional gene for argininosuccinate synthetase.  Two transcript variants encoding the same protein have been found for this gene.

Clinical significance
Mutations in the chromosome 9 copy of ASS cause citrullinemia.

40% to 90% of bladder cancers are deficient in argininosuccinate synthetase.

References

Further reading

External links
  GeneReviews/NCBI/NIH/UW entry on Urea Cycle Disorders Overview
GeneReviews/NCBI/NIH/UW entry on Argininosuccinate Synthetase Deficiency; ASS Deficiency; Argininosuccinic Acid Synthetase Deficiency; CTLN1; Citrullinemia, Classic